The Österreichisches Biographisches Lexikon 1815–1950 (ÖBL), Austrian Biographical Lexicon 1815-1950, is a dictionary of biographical entries for individuals who have contributed to the history of Austria, published by the Austrian Academy of Sciences. It currently comprises 12 volumes (60 deliveries) with a total of more than 16,000 biographies. It follows the Biographisches Lexikon des Kaiserthums Oesterreich (Biographical Encyclopedia of the Austrian Empire), which dealt with the period between 1750 and 1850 and which was published from 1856 to 1891 in 60 volumes, containing 24,254 critical biographies.

Published volumes 
Volume 1 (Aarau Friedrich–Gläser Franz), 1957 (reprinted without changes 1993). 
Volume 2 (Glaessner Arthur–Hübl Harald H.), 1959 (reprinted without changes 1993). 
Volume 3 (Hübl Heinrich–Knoller Richard), 1965 (reprinted without changes 1993). 
Volume 4 (Knolz Joseph J.–Lange Wilhelm), 1969 (reprinted without changes 1993). 
Volume 5 (Lange v. Burgenkron Emil–[Maier] Simon Martin), 1972 (reprinted without changes 1993). 
Volume 6 ([Maier] Stefan–Musger August), 1975. 
Volume 7 (Musić August–Petra-Petrescu Nicolae), 1978. 
Volume 8 (Petračić Franjo–Ražun Matej), 1983. 
Volume 9 (Rázus Martin–Savić Šarko), 1988. 
Volume 10 (Saviňek Slavko–Schobert Ernst), 1994 (2. unveränderte Auflage 1999). 
Volume 11 (Schoblik Friedrich–[Schwarz] Ludwig Franz), 1999. 
Volume 12 ([Schwarz] Marie–Spannagel Rudolf), 2005. 

The 59th and 60th deliveries were published in 2007 and 2008 (Spanner Anton Carl–Staudigl Oskar in the 59th delivery, Staudigl Oskar–Stich Ignaz in the 60th delivery).

References

External links
 ÖBL 
 ÖBL online (Full-text search. Registration required for some content.)

Austrian online encyclopedias
Austrian books
Biographical dictionaries
Austrian Academy of Sciences Press books